Signals are standardized messages sent to a running program to trigger specific behavior, such as quitting or error handling. They are a limited form of inter-process communication (IPC), typically used in Unix, Unix-like, and other POSIX-compliant operating systems.

A signal is an asynchronous notification sent to a process or to a specific thread within the same process to notify it of an event. Common uses of signals are to interrupt, suspend, terminate or kill a process.  Signals originated in 1970s Bell Labs Unix and were later specified in the POSIX standard.

When a signal is sent, the operating system interrupts the target process' normal flow of execution to deliver the signal. Execution can be interrupted during any non-atomic instruction. If the process has previously registered a signal handler, that routine is executed. Otherwise, the default signal handler is executed.

Embedded programs may find signals useful for inter-process communications, as signals are notable for their Algorithmic efficiency.

Signals are similar to interrupts, the difference being that interrupts are mediated by the CPU and handled by the kernel while signals are mediated by the kernel (possibly via system calls) and handled by individual processes. The kernel may pass an interrupt as a signal to the process that caused it (typical examples are SIGSEGV, SIGBUS, SIGILL and SIGFPE).

History
Version 1 Unix (1971) had separate system calls to catch interrupts, quits, and machine traps.

 appeared in Version 2 (1972).

Version 4 (1973) combined all traps into one call, .

Version 5 (1974) could send arbitrary signals. 

In Version 7 (1979) each numbered trap received a symbolic name.

Plan 9 from Bell Labs (mid 80s) replaced signals with notes, which permit sending short, arbitrary strings.

Sending signals
The  system call sends a specified signal to a specified process, if permissions allow. Similarly, the  command allows a user to send signals to processes. The  library function sends the specified signal to the current process.

Exceptions such as division by zero, segmentation violation (SIGSEGV), and floating point exception (SIGFPE) will cause a core dump and terminate the program.

The kernel can generate signals to notify processes of events. For example, SIGPIPE will be generated when a process writes to a pipe which has been closed by the reader; by default, this causes the process to terminate, which is convenient when constructing shell pipelines.

Typing certain key combinations at the controlling terminal of a running process causes the system to send it certain signals:

 Ctrl-C (in older Unixes, DEL) sends an INT signal ("interrupt", SIGINT); by default, this causes the process to terminate.
 Ctrl-Z sends a TSTP signal ("terminal stop", SIGTSTP); by default, this causes the process to suspend execution.
 Ctrl-\ sends a QUIT signal (SIGQUIT); by default, this causes the process to terminate and dump core.
 Ctrl-T (not supported on all UNIXes) sends an INFO signal (SIGINFO); by default, and if supported by the command, this causes the operating system to show information about the running command.

These default key combinations with modern operating systems can be changed with the  command.

Handling signals
If a signal handler is not installed for a particular signal, the default handler is used. Otherwise the signal is intercepted and the signal handler is invoked. The process can also specify two default behaviors, without creating a handler: ignore the signal (SIG_IGN) and use the default signal handler (SIG_DFL). There are two signals which cannot be intercepted and handled: SIGKILL and SIGSTOP.

Risks
Signal handling is vulnerable to race conditions. As signals are asynchronous, another signal (even of the same type) can be delivered to the process during execution of the signal handling routine.

The  call can be used to block and unblock delivery of signals. Blocked signals are not delivered to the process until unblocked. Signals that cannot be ignored (SIGKILL and SIGSTOP) cannot be blocked.

Signals can cause the interruption of a system call in progress, leaving it to the application to manage a non-transparent restart.

Signal handlers should be written in a way that does not result in any unwanted side-effects, e.g.  alteration, signal mask alteration, signal disposition change, and other global process attribute changes. In particular, the POSIX specification and the Linux man page  require that all system functions directly or indirectly called from a signal function are async-signal safe. The  man page gives a list of such async-signal safe system functions (practically the system calls), otherwise it is an undefined behavior. It is suggested to simply set some  variable in a signal handler, and to test it elsewhere.

Signal handlers can instead put the signal into a queue and immediately return. The main thread will then continue "uninterrupted" until signals are taken from the queue, such as in an event loop. "Uninterrupted" here means that operations that block may return prematurely and must be resumed, as mentioned above. Signals should be processed from the queue on the main thread and not by worker pools, as that reintroduces the problem of asynchronicity. However, managing a queue is not possible in an async-signal safe way with only , as only single reads and writes to such variables are guaranteed to be atomic, not increments or (fetch-and)-decrements, as would be required for a queue. Thus, effectively, only one signal per handler can be queued safely with  until it has been processed.

Relationship with hardware exceptions
A process's execution may result in the generation of a hardware exception, for instance, if the process attempts to divide by zero or incurs a page fault.

In Unix-like operating systems, this event automatically changes the processor context to start executing a kernel exception handler. In case of some exceptions, such as a page fault, the kernel has sufficient information to fully handle the event itself and resume the process's execution.

Other exceptions, however, the kernel cannot process intelligently and it must instead defer the exception handling operation to the faulting process. This deferral is achieved via the signal mechanism, wherein the kernel sends to the process a signal corresponding to the current exception. For example, if a process attempted integer divide by zero on an x86 CPU, a divide error exception would be generated and cause the kernel to send the SIGFPE signal to the process.

Similarly, if the process attempted to access a memory address outside of its virtual address space, the kernel would notify the process of this violation via a SIGSEGV (segmentation violation signal). The exact mapping between signal names and exceptions is obviously dependent upon the CPU, since exception types differ between architectures.

POSIX signals
The list below documents the signals specified in the Single Unix Specification. All signals are defined as macro constants in the <signal.h> header file. The name of the macro constant consists of a "SIG" prefix followed by a mnemonic name for the signal.

  and 
 "Signal abort", "signal input/output trap"
 The SIGABRT and SIGIOT signal is sent to a process to tell it to abort, i.e. to terminate. The signal is usually initiated by the process itself when it calls abort() function of the C Standard Library, but it can be sent to the process from outside like any other signal.
 ,  and 
 "Signal alarm", "signal VT alarm", "signal profiling timer alarm"
 The SIGALRM, SIGVTALRM and SIGPROF signal is sent to a process when the time limit specified in a call to a preceding alarm setting function (such as setitimer) elapses. SIGALRM is sent when real or clock time elapses. SIGVTALRM is sent when CPU time used by the process elapses. SIGPROF is sent when CPU time used by the process and by the system on behalf of the process elapses, i.e. when the profiling timer expires.
 
 "Signal bus"
 The SIGBUS signal is sent to a process when it causes a bus error. The conditions that lead to the signal being sent are, for example, incorrect memory access alignment or non-existent physical address.
 
 "Signal child"
 The SIGCHLD signal is sent to a process when a child process terminates, is interrupted, or resumes after being interrupted. One common usage of the signal is to instruct the operating system to clean up the resources used by a child process after its termination without an explicit call to the wait system call.
 
 "Signal continue"
 The SIGCONT signal instructs the operating system to continue (restart) a process previously paused by the SIGSTOP or SIGTSTP signal. One important use of this signal is in job control in the Unix shell.
 
 "Signal floating-point error"
 The SIGFPE signal is sent to a process when an exceptional (but not necessarily erroneous) condition has been detected in the floating point or integer arithmetic hardware. This may include division by zero, floating point underflow or overflow, integer overflow, an invalid operation or an inexact computation. Behaviour may differ depending on hardware.
 
 "Signal hangup"
 The SIGHUP signal is sent to a process when its controlling terminal is closed. It was originally designed to notify the process of a serial line drop (a hangup). In modern systems, this signal usually means that the controlling pseudo or virtual terminal has been closed. Many daemons (who have no controlling terminal) interpret receipt of this signal as a request to reload their configuration files and flush/reopen their logfiles instead of exiting. nohup is a command to make a command ignore the signal.
 
 "Signal illegal"
 The SIGILL signal is sent to a process when it attempts to execute an illegal, malformed, unknown, or privileged instruction.
 
 "Signal interrupt"
 The SIGINT signal is sent to a process by its controlling terminal when a user wishes to interrupt the process. This is typically initiated by pressing , but on some systems, the "delete" character or "break" key can be used.
 
 "Signal kill"
 The SIGKILL signal is sent to a process to cause it to terminate immediately (kill). In contrast to SIGTERM and SIGINT, this signal cannot be caught or ignored, and the receiving process cannot perform any clean-up upon receiving this signal. The following exceptions apply:
 Zombie processes cannot be killed since they are already dead and waiting for their parent processes to reap them.
 Processes that are in the blocked state will not die until they wake up again.
 The init process is special: It does not get signals that it does not want to handle, and thus it can ignore SIGKILL. An exception from this rule is while init is ptraced on Linux.
 An uninterruptibly sleeping process may not terminate (and free its resources) even when sent SIGKILL. This is one of the few cases in which a UNIX system may have to be rebooted to solve a temporary software problem.
SIGKILL is used as a last resort when terminating processes in most system shutdown procedures if it does not voluntarily exit in response to SIGTERM. To speed the computer shutdown procedure, Mac OS X 10.6, aka Snow Leopard, will send SIGKILL to applications that have marked themselves "clean" resulting in faster shutdown times with, presumably, no ill effects. The command  has a similar, while dangerous effect, when executed e.g. in Linux; it doesn't let programs save unsaved data. It has other options, and with none, uses the safer SIGTERM signal.
 
 "Signal pipe"
 The SIGPIPE signal is sent to a process when it attempts to write to a pipe without a process connected to the other end.
 
 "Signal poll"
 The SIGPOLL signal is sent when an event occurred on an explicitly watched file descriptor. Using it effectively leads to making asynchronous I/O requests since the kernel will poll the descriptor in place of the caller. It provides an alternative to active polling.
  to 
 "Signal real-time minimum", "signal real-time maximum"
 The SIGRTMIN to SIGRTMAX signals are intended to be used for user-defined purposes. They are real-time signals.
 
 "Signal quit"
 The SIGQUIT signal is sent to a process by its controlling terminal when the user requests that the process quit and perform a core dump.
 
 "Signal segmentation violation"
 The SIGSEGV signal is sent to a process when it makes an invalid virtual memory reference, or segmentation fault, i.e. when it performs a segmentation violation.
 
 "Signal stop"
 The SIGSTOP signal instructs the operating system to stop a process for later resumption.
 
 "Signal system call"
 The SIGSYS signal is sent to a process when it passes a bad argument to a system call. In practice, this kind of signal is rarely encountered since applications rely on libraries (e.g. libc) to make the call for them. SIGSYS can be received by applications violating the Linux Seccomp security rules configured to restrict them. SIGSYS can also be used to emulate foreign system calls, e.g. emulate Windows system calls on Linux.
 
 "Signal terminate"
 The SIGTERM signal is sent to a process to request its termination. Unlike the SIGKILL signal, it can be caught and interpreted or ignored by the process. This allows the process to perform nice termination releasing resources and saving state if appropriate. SIGINT is nearly identical to SIGTERM.
 
 "Signal terminal stop"
 The SIGTSTP signal is sent to a process by its controlling terminal to request it to stop (terminal stop). It is commonly initiated by the user pressing . Unlike SIGSTOP, the process can register a signal handler for, or ignore, the signal.
  and 
 The SIGTTIN and SIGTTOU signals are sent to a process when it attempts to read in or write out respectively from the tty while in the background. Typically, these signals are received only by processes under job control; daemons do not have controlling terminals and, therefore, should never receive these signals.
 
 "Signal trap"
 The SIGTRAP signal is sent to a process when an exception (or trap) occurs: a condition that a debugger has requested to be informed of for example, when a particular function is executed, or when a particular variable changes value.
 
 "Signal urgent"
 The SIGURG signal is sent to a process when a socket has urgent or out-of-band data available to read.
  and 
 "Signal user 1", "signal user 2""
 The SIGUSR1 and SIGUSR2 signals are sent to a process to indicate user-defined conditions.
 
 "Signal exceeded CPU"
 The SIGXCPU signal is sent to a process when it has used up the CPU for a duration that exceeds a certain predetermined user-settable value. The arrival of a SIGXCPU signal provides the receiving process a chance to quickly save any intermediate results and to exit gracefully, before it is terminated by the operating system using the SIGKILL signal.
 
 "Signal excess file size"
 The SIGXFSZ signal is sent to a process when it grows a file that exceeds the maximum allowed size.
 
 "Signal window change"
 The SIGWINCH signal is sent to a process when its controlling terminal changes its size (a window change).

Default action 
A process can define how to handle incoming POSIX signals. If a process does not define a behaviour for a signal, then the default handler for that signal is being used. The table below lists some default actions for POSIX-compliant UNIX systems, such as FreeBSD, OpenBSD and Linux.

 Portable number:
 For most signals the corresponding signal number is implementation-defined. This column lists the numbers specified in the POSIX standard.

 Actions explained:
 Terminate Abnormal termination of the process. The process is terminated with all the consequences of _exit() except that the status made available to wait() and waitpid() indicates abnormal termination by the specified signal.
 Terminate (core dump) Abnormal termination of the process. Additionally, implementation-defined abnormal termination actions, such as creation of a core file, may occur.
 Ignore Ignore the signal.
 Stop Stop (or suspend) the process.
 Continue Continue the process, if it is stopped; otherwise, ignore the signal.

Miscellaneous signals
The following signals are not specified in the POSIX specification. They are, however, sometimes used on various systems.

 
 The SIGEMT signal is sent to a process when an emulator trap occurs.
 
 The SIGINFO signal is sent to a process when a status (info) request is received from the controlling terminal.
 
 The SIGPWR signal is sent to a process when the system experiences a power failure.
 
 The SIGLOST signal is sent to a process when a file lock is lost.
 
 The SIGSTKFLT signal is sent to a process when the coprocessor experiences a stack fault (i.e. popping when the stack is empty or pushing when it is full). It is defined by, but not used on Linux, where a x87 coprocessor stack fault will generate SIGFPE instead.
 
 The SIGUNUSED signal is sent to a process when a system call with an unused system call number is made. It is synonymous with SIGSYS on most architectures.
 
 The SIGCLD signal is synonymous with SIGCHLD.

See also
 C signal handling

References

External links
 Unix Signals Table, Ali Alanjawi, University of Pittsburgh
 Man7.org Signal Man Page
 Introduction To Unix Signals Programming 
 Another Introduction to Unix Signals Programming (blog post, 2009)
 UNIX and Reliable POSIX Signals by Baris Simsek
 Signal Handlers by Henning Brauer

Inter-process communication
Control flow